The 2011 season was the 116th year in the club's history, the 100th season in Clube de Regatas do Flamengo's football existence, and their 41st in the Campeonato Brasileiro Série A, having never been relegated from the top division.

Club

First-team staff
Updated 23 May 2011.

Other information

First-team squad
As of 9 October 2011, according to combined sources on the official website.

Players with Dual Nationality
   Deivid
   Ronaldinho
   Darío Bottinelli
   Thomas

Flamengo Youth Team

Professional players able to play in the youth team

Youth players with first team experience

Out on loan

Transfers

In

Out

Statistics

Appearances and goals
Last updated on 5 December 2011.
 Players in italic have left the club during the season.

|}

Top scorers
Includes all competitive matches

Clean sheets
Includes all competitive matches

Disciplinary record

Overview

Competitions

Pre-season friendlies

Campeonato Carioca

Taça Guanabara

Matches

Semifinal

Final

Taça Rio

Matches

Semifinal

Final

Copa do Brasil

First round

Second round

Round of 16

Quarterfinals

Série A

Standings

Results summary

Pld=Matches played; W=Matches won; D=Matches drawn; L=Matches lost;

Results by round

Matches

Copa Sudamericana

Second stage

Round of 16

Honors

Individuals

IFFHS ranking
Flamengo position on the Club World Ranking during the 2011 season, according to IFFHS.

References

External links
 Clube de Regatas do Flamengo
 Flamengo official website (in Portuguese)

Brazilian football clubs 2011 season
2011